Mary Elizabeth Grenside Hewett (24 May 1857 – 8 April 1892) was a New Zealand school principal. She was born on 24 May 1857.

She had teaching qualifications from Queen's College, London, and had graduated from Newnham College, Cambridge.

She was first Acting Head at Otago Girls' High School in Dunedin, and then from 1883 was the founding Lady Principal of Napier Girls’ High School.

References

1857 births
1892 deaths
New Zealand schoolteachers
Alumni of Newnham College, Cambridge